Blanfordia bensoni is a species of land snail which has an operculum, a terrestrial gastropod mollusk in the family Pomatiopsidae.

Blanfordia bensoni is the type species of the genus Blanfordia.

Distribution 
This species is endemic to Japan. The type locality is "Matsumai, Yesso", Hokkaido.

It is a Vulnerable species.

Description 
The height of the shell is 8.5 mm.

Ecology 
This species lives as a terrestrial snail in inland forests.

References

External links 

Pomatiopsidae
Gastropods described in 1861